Statistics of Emperor's Cup in the 2000 season.

Overview
It was contested by 80 teams, and Kashima Antlers won the championship.

Results

First round
Nirasaki Astros 0–4 Hosei University
Fukuoka University 4–1 Shimizu Commercial High School
Gunma Fortuna 0–2 Consadole Sapporo
Kusatsu Higashi High School 3–1 Yamagata Chuo High School
Teihens F.C. 1–5 Albirex Niigata
Ritsumeikan University 2–4 Kunimi High School
Gifu Technical High School 1–7 Sagan Tosu
Kanagawa Teachers 1–0 YKK AP SC
Ehime FC 1–3 Yokohama
Aichi Gakuin University 1–0 Fukui KSC
Iwami 0–4 Shonan Bellmare
Kochi University 1–1 (PK 4–5) Kibi International University
Hatsushiba Hashimoto High School 0–5 Oita Trinita
Sanfrecce Hiroshima Youth 0–1 FC Ueda Gentian
Tenri University 0–6 Honda FC
Nippon Steel Corporation Oita FC 4–2 Nippon Steel Kamaishi FC
FC Primeiro 1–6 Denso
Juntendo University 3–2 TDK
Tottori 0–3 Omiya Ardija
Tokuyama University 1–0 Apple Sports College
Kwansei Gakuin University 2–1 Vegalta Sendai
Tochigi SC 3–0 Hachinohe University
Matsushita Electric Iga 0–4 Ventforet Kofu
Sony Sendai 2–3 Doto University
Saga Kita High School 0–12 Montedio Yamagata
NIFS Kanoya 1–4 Jatco SC
Kaiho Bank 0–3 Mito HollyHock
Yokogawa Electric 1–1 (PK 4–5) Hannan University
Saitama SC 0–2 Urawa Red Diamonds
NTT Kumamoto 0–2 Honda Lock
Tsukuba University 4–1 Tokai University
Sun Life FC 0–5 Otsuka Pharmaceuticals

Second round
Hosei University 2–3 Fukuoka University
Consadole Sapporo 6–0 Kusatsu Higashi High School
Albirex Niigata 2–0 Kunimi High School
Sagan Tosu 6–0 Kanagawa Teachers
Yokohama FC 1–2 Aichi Gakuin University
Shonan Bellmare 3–0 Kibi International University
Oita Trinita 7–0 FC Ueda Gentian
Honda 2–0 Nippon Steel Corporation Oita FC
Denso 2–1 Juntendo University
Omiya Ardija 4–1 Tokuyama University
Kwansei Gakuin University 0–1 Tochigi
Ventforet Kofu 2–1 Doto University
Montedio Yamagata 1–2 Jatco SC
Mito HollyHock 2–0 Hannan University
Urawa Red Diamonds 9–0 Honda Lock
Tsukuba University 1–1 (PK 2–4) Otsuka Pharmaceuticals

Third round
Yokohama F. Marinos 2–0 Fukuoka University
Kyoto Purple Sanga 0–1 Consadole Sapporo
Verdy Kawasaki 2–1 Albirex Niigata
Kashima Antlers 2–1 Sagan Tosu
Júbilo Iwata 5–0 Aichi Gakuin University
Nagoya Grampus Eight 3–2 Shonan Bellmare
Gamba Osaka 4–1 Oita Trinita
Kashiwa Reysol 2–1 Honda
Shimizu S-Pulse 3–0 Denso
Avispa Fukuoka 4–2 Omiya Ardija
JEF United Ichihara 1–0 Tochigi SC
Tokyo 0–1 Ventforet Kofu
Vissel Kobe 2–1 Jatco SC
Sanfrecce Hiroshima 7–0 Mito HollyHock
Kawasaki Frontale 0–2 Urawa Red Diamonds
Cerezo Osaka 2–1 Otsuka Pharmaceuticals

Fourth round
Yokohama F. Marinos 2–1 Consadole Sapporo
Verdy Kawasaki 0–2 Kashima Antlers
Júbilo Iwata 2–0 Nagoya Grampus Eight
Gamba Osaka 1–1 (PK 10–9) Kashiwa Reysol
Shimizu S-Pulse 1–0 Avispa Fukuoka
JEF United Ichihara 3–1 Ventforet Kofu
Vissel Kobe 1–0 Sanfrecce Hiroshima
Urawa Red Diamonds 1–4 Cerezo Osaka

Quarter finals
Yokohama F. Marinos 1–1 (PK 1–4) Kashima Antlers
Júbilo Iwata 0–1 Gamba Osaka
Shimizu S-Pulse 3–1 JEF United Ichihara
Vissel Kobe 2–2 (PK 4–3) Cerezo Osaka

Semi finals
Kashima Antlers 3–2 Gamba Osaka
Shimizu S-Pulse 1–0 Vissel Kobe

Final

Kashima Antlers 3–2 Shimizu S-Pulse
Kashima Antlers won the championship.

References
 NHK

Emperor's Cup
Emp
2001 in Japanese football